Nanosaurus ("small or dwarf lizard") is the name given to a genus of neornithischian dinosaur that lived about 155 to 148 million years ago, during the Late Jurassic-age. Its fossils are known from the Morrison Formation of the south-western United States. The type and only species, Nanosaurus agilis, was described and named by Othniel Charles Marsh in 1877. The taxon has a complicated taxonomic history, largely the work of Marsh and Peter M. Galton, involving the genera Laosaurus, Hallopus, Drinker, Othnielia, and Othnielosaurus, the latter three now being considered to be synonyms of Nanosaurus. It had historically been classified as a hypsilophodont or fabrosaur, types of generalized small bipedal herbivore, but more recent research has abandoned these groupings as paraphyletic and Nanosaurus is today considered a basal member of Neornithischia.

Description

Nanosaurus is known from material from all parts of the body, including two good skeletons, although the skull is still poorly known. It was a small animal, 2 meters (6.6 ft) or less in length and 10 kilograms (22 lb) or less in weight.

It was a bipedal dinosaur with short forelimbs and long hindlimbs with large processes for muscle attachments. The hands were short and broad with short fingers. The head was small. It had small leaf-shaped cheek teeth (triangular and with small ridges and denticles lining the front and back edges), and premaxillary teeth with less ornamentation. 

Like several other neornithischian dinosaurs, such as Hypsilophodon, Thescelosaurus, and Talenkauen, Nanosaurus had thin plates lying along the ribs. Called intercostal plates, these structures were cartilaginous in origin.

History and taxonomy

Marsh's original groundwork

Nanosaurus has had a long and complicated taxonomic history. In 1877, Marsh named two species of Nanosaurus in separate publications, based on partial remains from the Morrison Formation of Garden Park, Colorado. One paper described N. agilis, based on YPM 1913, with remains including impressions of a dentary, and postcranial bits including an ilium, thigh bones, shin bones, and a fibula. The other paper named N. rex, a second species which Marsh based on YPM 1915 (also called 1925 in Galton, 2007), a complete thigh bone. He regarded both species as small ("fox-sized") animals. A third species, N. victor, was named, which he soon recognized to be something completely different, and is now known as the small, bipedal crocodylomorph Hallopus.

The next year, he named the new genus Laosaurus on material collected by Samuel Wendell Williston from Como Bluff, Wyoming. Two species were named: the type species L. celer, based on parts of eleven vertebrae (YPM 1875); and the "smaller" L. gracilis, originally based on a back vertebra's centrum, a caudal centrum, and part of an ulna (review by Peter Galton in 1983 finds the specimen to now consist of thirteen back and eight caudal centra, and portions of both hindlimbs). A third species, L. consors, was established by Marsh in 1894 for YPM 1882, which consists of most of one articulated skeleton and part of at least one other individual. The skull was only partially preserved, and the fact that the vertebrae were represented only by centra suggests a partially grown individual. Galton (1983) notes that much of the current mounted skeleton was restored in plaster, or had paint applied.

Galton's taxonomic revisions

These animals attracted little professional attention until the 1970s and 1980s, when Peter Galton reviewed many of the "hypsilophodonts" in a series of papers. In 1973, he and Jim Jensen described a partial skeleton (BYU ESM 163 as of Galton, 2007) missing the head, hands, and tail as Nanosaurus? rex, which had been damaged by other collectors prior to description. By 1977, he had concluded that Nanosaurus agilis was quite different from N. rex and the new skeleton, and coined Othnielia for the latter species. The paper (primarily concerning the transcontinental nature of Dryosaurus) considered Laosaurus consors and L. gracilis synonyms of O. rex without elaboration, and considered L. celer an invalid nomen nudum.

In 1990, Robert Bakker, Peter Galton, James Siegwarth, and James Filla described remains of a dinosaur they named Drinker nisti. The name is somewhat ironic; Drinker, named for renowned palaeontologist Edward Drinker Cope whose infamous "bone wars" with rival Othniel Charles Marsh produced many dinosaur fossils which are world-famous today, was described as a probable close relative of Othnielia, named for Marsh. The species name refers to the National Institute of Standards and Technology (NIST). Discovered by Siegwarth and Filla in upper Morrison Formation beds at Como Bluff, Wyoming, it was based on a partial subadult skeleton (listed as CPS 106 originally, then as Tate 4001 by Bakker 1996) including partial jaws, vertebrae, and partial limbs. Several other specimens found in the same area were assigned to it, mostly consisting of vertebral and hindlimb remains, and teeth. The holotype specimen's current location is unknown; according to Carpenter and Galton (2018), the previous two institutions reported to have had it did not ever curate the specimen, and the collection it was originally said to be in never existed at all.

Several decades later, in his 2007 study of the teeth of Morrison ornithischians, Galton concluded that the holotype femur of Othniela rex is not diagnostic, and reassigned the BYU skeleton to Laosaurus consors, which is based on better material. As the genus Laosaurus is also based on nondiagnostic material, he gave the species L. consors its own genus, Othnielosaurus. As a result, in practical terms, what had been thought of as Othnielia is now known as Othnielosaurus consors. Regarding Nanosaurus agilis, Galton considered it a potentially valid basal ornithopod, and noted similarities to heterodontosaurids in the thigh bone. He tentatively assigned to it some teeth that had been referred to Drinker. 

Another decade later, in 2018, Galton, alongside Kenneth Carpenter, described a new ornithischian specimen. They found it very similar to the fragmentary holotype of Nanosaurus, but more clear in its anatomical features. Their new specimen was also found to display extreme similarity with the specimens of Othnielosaurus and Drinker. Due to the new data, they concluded that all three species, alongside Othnielia, represented the same animal, united under the name Nanosaurus agilis. This painted a new picture of a singular, very common small dinosaur known from a large amount of material. This conclusion has been recognized by papers since, some of which incorporating the new, all-encompassing taxon into their phylogenetic analyses.

Classification
The cladogram below results from analysis by Herne et al., 2019.

Paleobiology and paleoecology 

Nanosaurus was one of the smaller members of the diverse Morrison Formation dinosaur fauna, diminutive in comparison to the giant sauropods. The Morrison Formation is interpreted as a semiarid environment with distinct wet and dry seasons, and flat floodplains. Vegetation varied from river-lining gallery forests of conifers, tree ferns, and ferns, to fern savannas with rare trees. It has been a rich fossil hunting ground, holding fossils of green algae, fungi, mosses, horsetails, ferns, cycads, ginkgoes, and several families of conifers. Other fossils discovered include bivalves, snails, ray-finned fishes, frogs, salamanders, turtles, sphenodonts, lizards, terrestrial and aquatic crocodylomorphs, several species of pterosaur, numerous dinosaur species, and early mammals such as docodonts, multituberculates, symmetrodonts, and triconodonts. Such dinosaurs as the theropods Ceratosaurus, Allosaurus, Ornitholestes, and Torvosaurus, the sauropods Apatosaurus, Brachiosaurus, Camarasaurus, and Diplodocus, and the ornithischians Camptosaurus, Dryosaurus, and Stegosaurus are known from the Morrison. Nanosaurus is present in stratigraphic zones 2-5.

Typically, Nanosaurus has been interpreted like other hypsilophodonts as a small, swift herbivore, although Bakker (1986) interpreted Nanosaurus as an omnivore.

References

Late Jurassic dinosaurs of North America
Ornithischian genera
Dinosaurs of the Morrison Formation
Taxa named by Othniel Charles Marsh
Fossil taxa described in 1877
Paleontology in Colorado